The FIFA Women's World Cup is an international association football competition established in 1991. It is contested by the women's national teams of the members of FIFA, the sport's global governing body. The tournament has taken place every four years. The most recent World Cup, hosted by France in 2019, was won by the United States, who beat the Netherlands 2–0 to win their second consecutive and fourth overall title.

Just like the men's tournament the World Cup final match is the last of the competition, and the result determines which country is declared world champions. If after 90 minutes of regular play the score is a draw, an additional 30-minute period of play, called extra time, is added. If such a game is still tied after extra time it is decided by kicks from the penalty shoot-out. The winning penalty shoot-out area team are then declared champions. The tournament has been decided by a one-off match on every occasion.

List of finals

 The "Year" column refers to the year the World Cup was held, and wikilinks to the article about that tournament. The wikilinks in the "Final score" column point to the article about that tournament's final game. Links in the "Winners" and "Runners-up" columns point to the articles for the national football teams of the countries, not the articles for the countries.

Results by nation

Results by confederation

Note

References

External links
 FIFA official site

 
 
Lists of FIFA Women's World Cup matches
Finals